Jan Trousil (born 9 April 1976) is a former Czech footballer who played as a defender. He is the current manager of Vyškov.

References
 
 Guardian Football

Czech footballers
1976 births
Living people
Czech First League players
FC Hradec Králové players
1. FC Slovácko players
SK Kladno players
FC Zbrojovka Brno players
FK Dubnica players
Slovak Super Liga players
Expatriate footballers in Slovakia
Association football defenders
People from Kutná Hora
Sportspeople from the Central Bohemian Region